Alvania slieringsi is a species of minute sea snail, a marine gastropod mollusk or micromollusk in the family Rissoidae.

Distribution
Found in European waters, and Canary Island.

References

Rissoidae
Gastropods described in 1998